Sima Gao Bridge is a historic stone arch bridge in the town of Chongfu, Tongxiang, Zhejiang, China.

History
The bridge was first built in the 14th century, in the ruling of Hongwu Emperor in the Ming dynasty (1368–1644). It was rebuilt in 1749, in the 14th year of Qianlong Emperor's reign during the Qing dynasty (1644–1911), and was damaged by war in 1864, in the ruling of Tongzhi Emperor. Yu Liyuan, the magistrate of Shimen County, reconstructed it in 1876. In March 2005, it was designated as a cultural relic protection unit at provincial level by the Zhejiang Government.

Architecture
A pair of Chinese guardian lions stands on both sides of its baluster shafts.

References

Bridges in Zhejiang
Arch bridges in China
Qing dynasty architecture
Bridges completed in 1876
Buildings and structures completed in 1876